Humphrey Brown (1803 – 6 June 1860) was a British Whig politician.

Brown was first elected Whig MP for Tewkesbury at the 1847 general election and held the seat until 1857, when he was defeated. Although he attempted to regain the seat at a by-election in 1859—caused by the appointment of Frederick Lygon as a Civil Lord of the Admiralty–he was unsuccessful.

References

External links
 

Whig (British political party) MPs for English constituencies
UK MPs 1847–1852
UK MPs 1852–1857
1803 births
1860 deaths